Sebastián Diego Peratta (born 1 November 1976 in Buenos Aires) is an Argentine football goalkeeper currently playing for Deportivo Morón in the Primera B Metropolitana.

Peratta started his career in 1999 with Deportivo Morón in the lower leagues of Argentine football. In 2003, he was signed by Vélez Sársfield of the Argentine Primera, but after being used as the first choice goalkeeper in his first season he was mainly used as a reserve goalkeeper.

In 2005 Peratta was part of the squad that won the Clausura 2005 tournament.

In 2007 Peratta began to re-establish himself as the no 1 goalkeeper at Velez, but in September that year he tore the cruciate knee ligament in his right knee. He was transferred to Newell's Old Boys in August 2008.

Honours
Vélez Sársfield
Primera División: 2005 Clausura

Newell's Old Boys
Primera División: 2013 Final

External links
 Argentine Primera statistics
 Football-Lineups player profile

1976 births
Living people
Footballers from Buenos Aires
Argentine footballers
Association football goalkeepers
Club Atlético Vélez Sarsfield footballers
Newell's Old Boys footballers
Deportivo Morón footballers
Quilmes Atlético Club footballers
Argentine Primera División players